Tomáš Urban may refer to:

 Tomáš Urban (footballer) (born 1968), football (soccer) player
  (born 1989), Slovak handball player; see 2022 European Men's Handball Championship
 Tomáš Urban (ice hockey) (born 1985), Czech ice hockey player

See also
 Thomas Urban
 Tom Urbani
 Thomas Urbain